The Europe/Africa Zone was one of the three zones of the regional Davis Cup competition in 1991.

In the Europe/Africa Zone there were two different tiers, called groups, in which teams competed against each other to advance to the upper tier. The winner in the Europe Zone Group II advanced to the Europe/Africa Zone Group I in 1992.

Participating nations

Draw

  promoted to Group I in 1992.

First round

Norway vs. Bulgaria

Cyprus vs. Greece

Luxembourg vs. Monaco

Malta vs. Turkey

Second round

Norway vs. Greece

Luxembourg vs. Turkey

Third round

Norway vs. Luxembourg

References

External links
Davis Cup official website

Davis Cup Europe/Africa Zone
Europe Zone Group II